Ralph Green may refer to:

Ralph Green (footballer) (1911–1991), Australian rules footballer
Ralph Green (alpine skier), American Paralympian in 2011 IPC Alpine Skiing World Championships – Downhill
Ralph Green (MP), Member of Parliament (MP) for Northamptonshire

See also
Petey Greene (Ralph Waldo Greene, Jr., 1931–1984), African-American television and radio talk-show host